The 1986 Penn Quakers football team represented the University of Pennsylvania in the 1986 NCAA Division I-AA football season.  Penn went undefeated (10-0), won the Ivy League Championship, and ranked 7 in NCAA Division I-AA.

Schedule

Roster

References

Penn
Penn Quakers football seasons
Ivy League football champion seasons
College football undefeated seasons
Penn Quakers football